The 2011 European Table Tennis Championships was held in Gdańsk–Sopot, Poland from 8–16 October 2011. Venue for the competition was Ergo Arena.

Medal summary

Men's events

Women's events

References

2011
European Championships
International sports competitions hosted by Poland
Table Tennis European Championships
Sports competitions in Gdańsk
Sport in Sopot
European Table Tennis Championships
Table tennis in Poland
European Table Tennis Championships, 2011